The 2020–21 Tunisian Women's Championship was the 15th season of the Tunisian Women's Championship, the Tunisian national women's association football competition. AS Banque de l'Habitat are the defending champions.

Clubs

Group stage

Group A

Group B

Knockout stage

Bracket

References

External links
Women football - FTF official website

Tunisian Women's Championship